The 1999 City of Dundee City Council election took place on 6 May 1999 to elect members of City of Dundee Council, as part of that years Scottish local elections.

Election results

References

1999
1999 Scottish local elections
20th century in Dundee